The 2016 Jiangsu Suning F.C. season is the club's eighth consecutive season in Chinese Super League. On 21 December 2015 the club was purchased by Suning Commerce Group for ¥523 million and changed their name as Jiangsu Suning F.C. Jiangsu Suning are also competing in the 2016 Chinese FA Super Cup, 2016 Chinese FA Cup, and the 2016 AFC Champions League.

Squad

As of 29 February 2016

Transfers
In January, Jiangsu Suning broke their transfer fee record twice in the same window, with a fee of £25 million paid for Ramires from Chelsea F.C., and later fellow Brazilian Alex Teixeira for a fee of €50 million (£37 million) from Shakhtar Donetsk

In

Winter

Out

Winter

Competitions

Overview

{| class="wikitable" style="text-align: center"
|-
!rowspan=2|Competition
!colspan=8|Record
|-
!
!
!
!
!
!
!
!
|-
| Chinese Super League

|-
| Chinese FA Super Cup

|-
| Champions League

|-
! Total

Chinese FA Super Cup

Chinese Super League

Overall placement

Results summary

Chinese FA Cup

AFC Champions League

For winning the Chinese FA Cup in the previous year, Jiangsu Suning have qualified for the Group Stage of the 2016 AFC Champions League. Jiangsu Suning were drawn in Group E with Korea's Jeonbuk Hyundai Motors, Japan team FC Tokyo, and Becamex Bình Dương from Vietnam. They were eliminated after a draw kept them with nine points, just one point below Jeonbuk Hyundai Motors and FC Tokyo.

Group stage

Notes

References

External links
Official website  

Chinese football clubs 2016 season
Jiangsu F.C. seasons